3901 Connecticut Avenue NW is a six-story Tudor Revival apartment building in the North Cleveland Park (also known as Van Ness) neighborhood of Washington, D.C.  Designed by architect George T. Santmyers, 3901 Connecticut Avenue was built in 1927 for developer Harry Bralove.  The building was added to the District of Columbia Inventory of Historic Sites on March 28, 1996, and listed on the National Register of Historic Places on September 11, 1997.

See also
 National Register of Historic Places listings in Washington, D.C.

References

Apartment buildings in Washington, D.C.
District of Columbia Inventory of Historic Sites
Residential buildings completed in 1927
Residential buildings on the National Register of Historic Places in Washington, D.C.
Tudor Revival architecture in Washington, D.C.